The Western Mustangs women's ice hockey team represents the University of Western Ontario Western Mustangs and competes in the Ontario University Athletics conference, which participates nationally in the U Sports athletic program. The Mustangs play at Thompson Arena in London, Ontario.

The women's hockey team has won 2 Ontario University Athletics women's ice hockey championships (2014–15 and 2017–18) and 1 U Sports championship (2014–15).

The current coach of the team is Candice Moxley, who was a prior head coach for the Markham Thunder as well as the Buffalo State Women’s Division III hockey team. Moxley joined the Mustangs in 2018-19 season.

History
On October 21, 2010, the Mustangs played the Chinese national women's hockey team. The game ended in a 2-2 tie as Katie Dillon notched both goals. From January 29, 2011 to February 6, 2011, Katie Dillon led the OUA with a four-game point scoring streak in which she registered four goals. On February 11, 2011, Mustangs captain Ellie Seedhouse scores a goal in her final CIS game as Western fell to the Brock Badgers by a 5-1 mark.

Two Mustangs rookies were named to the 2012 OUA All-Rookie team. Stacey Scott led all rookies with 27 points, which ranked eighth overall among all OUA skaters. Katelyn Gosling accumulated 13 points, which finished second among rookie defenders. Her 13 points helped rank her sixth overall among all OUA blueliners in scoring, respectively.

At the end of the 2011-12 season, Tawn Rellinger and Katie Dillon, both fourth-year players, decided to cut off their hair and donate it to Locks of Love.

The 2014-15 season represented numerous milestones for the Mustangs. Finishing in first place in the OUA standings, the Mustangs would capture their first-ever McCaw Cup championship, followed by a Golden Path Trophy triumph, awarded to the U Sports National Champions. Additionally, the roster produced a trio of OUA First-Team All-Stars, a First-Team All-Canadian.

Team Success 
-         National Champions 2015

-         National Silver Medalists 2018

-         OUA Champions 2015, 2018

-         OUA Silver medalists 2012, 2013, 2016

The Mustangs have been Ontario University Athletics (OUA) Champions in 2015 & 2018, USports Champions in 2015, Silver Medalists in 2018 and nationally ranked in the top 10 of Canadian Interuniversity Sports (U SPORTS).

Regular Season by season results

Leading scorers

Winter Universiade: International University Sports Federation (FISU) 
The Winter Universiade is a biennial international multi-sport event. Players are selected across the U SPORTS’s 33 Women’s Varsity Hockey teams to represent Canada.

Awards and honours
Carmen Lasis, 2018 U SPORTS Women’s Hockey Championship Tournament All-Star Team

Team Awards

Most Valuable Player
2019-20: April Clark

University Awards
2019 Western Mustangs Female Athlete of the Year: April Clark

FWP Jones Award 
Presented to the Western female student athlete who has made the greatest contribution to athletics within the University

OUA Awards 
2015 OUA Team of the Year

OUA Most Valuable Player

OUA Forward of the Year

OUA 1st Team All-Stars

OUA 2nd Team All-Stars

OUA All-Rookie Team

U Sports Awards

Marion Hilliard Award (Outstanding Student-Athlete)

USPORTS 1st Team All-Stars

USPORTS 2nd Team All-Stars

Mustangs in professional hockey

Kelly Campbell was selected by the Brampton Thunder in the 14th round of the 2016 CWHL Draft but never appeared with the team.

References

University of Western Ontario
Sports teams in London, Ontario
U Sports women's ice hockey teams
Women's ice hockey teams in Canada
Ice hockey teams in Ontario
Western Mustangs
Women in Ontario